Heidi Astrup (born 31 May 1972) is a former Danish team handball player and Olympic champion. She received a gold medal with the Danish national team at the 1996 Summer Olympics in Atlanta. She is two times European champion, and received a bronze medal at the 1995 World championship.

Achievements
Damehåndboldligaen:
Winner: 1994, 1995, 1996, 1997, 1999, 2000, 2001, 2002, 2006
Silver Medalist: 1991, 1993, 1998, 2005, 2007
DHF Landspokalturneringen:
Winner: 1996
EHF Champions League:
Winner: 2006
Finalist: 1997, 2001
EHF Cup:
Winner: 1994, 1999

References
http://history.eurohandball.com/ec/cl/men/2002-03/player/505072/Heidi+HolmeAstrup

1972 births
Living people
Danish female handball players
Olympic gold medalists for Denmark
Handball players at the 1996 Summer Olympics
Viborg HK players
Olympic medalists in handball
Medalists at the 1996 Summer Olympics